Rio Mangini (born October 6, 2002) is an American actor, musician, and composer. He is known for his roles as Ace McFumbles in Bella and the Bulldogs and as McQuaid in Everything Sucks!

Life and career
Rio Mangini is the son of Academy Award-winning sound editor Mark Mangini. His father is of Italian descent. His mother is of Māori and German descent.

Mangini is a pianist. He placed first in the 2011 Cypress College Competition (8-year-old division) and received an honorable mention in the 2011 American Protege International Piano Strings Competition. As a pianist, he was awarded by Young Artist Awards in 2012 with a special award in the category "Outstanding Instrumentalist".

In 2012, Mangini starred as Jax in Lisanne Sartor's short film Six Letter Word. The film made it through the Emerging Filmmaker Showcase in 2013 to the Cannes Film Festival. In 2013, he appeared in various films and television projects including The Garcias Have Landed, Marvin Marvin, What If, and Kickin' It. In 2014, Mangini appeared in Good Luck Charlie, Switched at Birth, Doc McStuffins, and See Dad Run. He also appeared in the films Pizza Bear Delivery Challenge, The Little Rascals Save the Day, and Finders Keepers. He appeared in One Crazy Cruise, Miles from Tomorrowland, and Bella and the Bulldogs in 2015, Teen Wolf in 2016, and General Hospital in 2017.

In 2018, Mangini appeared in Lethal Weapon and Just Add Magic and starred in the Netflix comedy-drama series Everything Sucks! as McQuaid. He is set to star in Reach, as well as compose and perform music for the film.

Filmography

Accolades

Young Artist Awards

|-
| 2012
| Rio Mangini
| Special Award–Outstanding Instrumentalist
| 
|-
| 2014
| Kickin' It
| Best Performance in a TV Series (Recurring Young Actor 10 and Under)
| 
|-
| 2015
| Good Luck Charlie
| Best Performance in a TV Series (Guest Starring Young Actor 11–14)
| 
|-
| 2016
| One Crazy Cruise
| Best Performance in a TV Movie, Miniseries, Special or Pilot (Young Actor)
| 
|-
| 2016
| Bella and the Bulldogs
| Best Performance in a TV Series (Recurring Young Actor 13 and Under)
| 
|-
| 2017
| Teen Wolf
| Best Performance in a TV Series (Guest Starring Teen Actor)
| 
|-
| 2017
| Lasso and Comet
| Best Performance in a Voice-Over Role (Young Actor 12–21)
| 
|-
| 2017
| Bella and the Bulldogs
| Best Performance in a TV series (Recurring Teen Actor)
| 
|}

Young Entertainer Awards

|-
| 2016
| One Lazy Cruise
| Best Leading Young Actor (Television Movie, Mini Series or Special)
| 
|-
| 2017
| Bella and the Bulldogs
| Best Supporting Young Actor (Television Series)
| 
|-
| 2017
| Teen Wolf
| Best Guest Starring Young Actor (Television Series)
| 
|-
| 2017
| Lasso & Comet
| Best Young Actor (Voice Over Role)
| 
|}

References

External links
 

2002 births
Living people
21st-century American male actors
American male child actors